Michael John Sutton (5 October 1944 – 26 December 2020) was an English professional footballer. He played in the Football League for three clubs. Two of his sons, Chris and John, have also played professionally.

Playing career
Sutton began his career in his home city of Norwich with Norwich City, with whom he turned professional in September 1962. He made more than 50 league appearances over the next five years and then joined Chester. This followed successful efforts by Chester manager Peter Hauser to persuade a disillusioned Sutton not to go ahead with his plans to quit football. Sutton played in all league games over the next three seasons (including one substitute appearance) before moving to Carlisle United for £10,000 at a time when Chester were in financial difficulties.

Unfortunately, Sutton was forced to retire from playing professional football two years later due to injury. Sutton then spent four years studying physical education and biology at Loughborough University and became a teacher at Hellesdon High School, in Norwich. He returned to football by playing for Great Yarmouth Town for eight years and became involved in coaching youngsters at Norwich City.

Sutton was also actively involved with Drayton Cricket Club for many years, including a spell as club chairman from 2003 to 2005.

Death
Sutton died on 26 December 2020, aged 76. He had suffered from dementia for the past decade. His son Chris Sutton had spoken about his father's condition as part of a campaign to persuade football authorities to do more to protect players from the effects of repeated heading of the ball.

External links
Drayton Cricket Club profile

References

1944 births
2020 deaths
Footballers from Norwich
English footballers
Association football midfielders
English Football League players
Norwich City F.C. players
Chester City F.C. players
Carlisle United F.C. players
Great Yarmouth Town F.C. players
Alumni of Loughborough University
Schoolteachers from Norfolk
People from Horsford